All-New, All-Different Marvel (ANADM) is a 2015–2019 branding for Marvel Comics' entire main line of comics. Taking place after the crossover storyline "Secret Wars", it details the new Marvel Universe, with nearly 60–65 titles relaunched with first issues, with a total of 76 issues. Marvel NOW! 2.0 and Marvel Legacy are concurrent with it.

Publication history
It was announced in February 2015 by Marvel that following the "Secret Wars" storyline, a new universe would be established by combining the 616 Universe and 1610 Ultimate Universe. Soon after, Marvel revealed a title called the All-New, All-Different Avengers for Free Comic Book Day, a preview of the new Marvel Universe that featured many "legacy heroes", a term used for new characters taking on the role of established heroes. The comic also featured a preview of Uncanny Inhumans.

In early June 2015, Marvel unveiled two photos depicting many of its iconic and lesser known characters post-"Secret Wars". Among these were Gwen Stacy's Spider-Woman counterpart, X-23 as the new Wolverine, Old Man Logan, Phil Coulson, Vision, Spider-Woman, Doctor Strange (wielding an axe), Black Panther, Thing in a Guardians of the Galaxy uniform, Red Wolf, Miles Morales, Peter Parker, Ant-Man, Steve Rogers' elderly appearance, Kamala Khan, Doctor Spectrum, Rocket Raccoon, Star-Lord, Iron Man, Daredevil, Hyperion, Inferno, a Citizen V, and Medusa. Sam Wilson and Jane Foster remained in their adopted roles of Captain America and Thor, respectively. After this, the company began revealing titles on a bi-daily basis. The new Invincible Iron Man series had Iron Man learning about who his birth parents are after it was revealed that Howard Stark and Maria Stark had adopted him and that Arno Stark was their biological son.

Marvel unveiled most of its new titles in late June 2015, after a book detailing the titles was shipped out to retailers, which was officially released on July 1. Three more titles were announced at the San Diego Comic-Con the following month, after which Marvel began sparsely revealing even more comics.

In May 2016, Marvel announced the return of Marvel NOW! (Marvel NOW! 2.0) following the conclusion of the "Civil War II" storyline. Marvel Executive Editor Tom Brevoort stated that the relaunch is timed to coincide with "Civil War II" as means to "refresh and revitalize" the titles explaining, "One of the things a big event story is judged on, rightly or wrongly, is what kind of an impact it has on the Marvel Universe in its aftermath. That just becomes a condition of these big event stories: what is it at the end that changes the landscape?"

ANADM was succeeded by Marvel Legacy, which in its turn was succeeded by Fresh Start, another line-wide relaunch by Marvel Comics in mid 2018.

Titles involved

Collected editions

References

Marvel Comics storylines
2015 comics debuts
Superhero comics
Comic book reboots